The Penticton Vees are a junior "A" ice hockey team from Penticton, British Columbia, Canada. They are a part of the British Columbia Hockey League. The junior Vees were founded in 1961, sharing the name of the senior hockey team, the Penticton Vees.

History
The Junior Vees were one of the inaugural teams in the Okanagan-Mainline Junior A Hockey League (OMJHL), launched in 1961. The league became the British Columbia Junior Hockey League (BCJHL) in 1967.

Although it is commonly thought by many that the name "Vees" refers to "victory", the name actually represents the three types of local peaches (Vedette, Valiant and Victory).

The Vees were Mowat Cup champions in 1968, 1973, 1980, 1981, 1982, 1985, as well as in 1986, when they were also Centennial Cup champions. After 26 years since their last RBC Cup appearance, the Vees advanced to the championship game in the 2012 RBC Cup in Humboldt, Saskatchewan, defeating the Woodstock Slammers 4–3 on a goal by Joey Benik to win the Canadian National Junior A Championship.

Season-by-season record
Note: GP = Games played, W = Wins, L = Losses, T = Ties, OTL = Overtime Losses, Pts = Points, GF = Goals for, GA = Goals against, PIM = Penalties in minutes

Records as of 2019–20 season.

Western Canada Cup
Western Canada Cup was the Western Canada Junior A Championship held from 2013 to 2017. The champions from the AJHL, BCHL, MJHL,  SJHL, and a host team competed in round-robin tournament. After the round-robin, the first and second place team played for championship, the loser then played a runner-up g game against the winner of a third vs. fourth semifinal game. The champion and runners-up would then qualify to compete for the RBC Cup and the National Junior A Championship.

National Junior A Championship
The National Junior A Championship, formerly known as the Royal Bank Cup from 1996 to 2018, is the annual championship tournament for Hockey Canada's junior A hockey leagues. Depending on the year, various regional champions, qualifiers, and hosts participate in the championship tournament. The tournament usually consists of opening in a round-robin with the top four teams then advancing to a semifinal were the winners compete a championship game.

NHL alumni
Forty-three alumni of the junior Penticton team have moved on to play in the National Hockey League.

Penticton Broncos (1964–1975)
 Bruce Affleck, Tony Currie, Gary Donaldson, Reg Kerr, Dave McLelland, Vic Mercredi, Grant Mulvey, Bob Nicholson
Penticton Vees (1975–1979)
 Ross Fitzpatrick, Darren Jensen, Kevin Maxwell, Andy Moog, Howard Walker

Penticton Knights (1979–1990)
 Rick Boh, Jim Camazzola, Ed Cristofoli, Neil Eisenhut, Ray Ferraro, Norm Foster, Brett Hull, Ian Kidd, Scott Levins, Derek Mayer, Joe Murphy, Scott Sharples

Penticton Panthers (1990–2004)
 Mike Brown, Kyle Cumiskey, Paul Kariya, Duncan Keith, Chuck Kobasew, Rick Lanz, Brendan Morrison, Jason Podollan, Kevin Sawyer, Robbie Tallas, Tanner Glass, Matt Zaba

Penticton Vees (2004–present) 
 Zac Dalpe, Ryan Johansen, Beau Bennett, Curtis McKenzie, Mike Reilly, Troy Stecher, Tyson Jost, Dante Fabbro,  Hunter Miska

See also
List of ice hockey teams in British Columbia
Penticton Vees (senior)

References

External links
Penticton Vees official website

British Columbia Hockey League teams
Sport in Penticton
1961 establishments in British Columbia
Ice hockey clubs established in 1961